Āsār-e Ajam (lit. "Antiquities of the Persians") is a travelogue and historical book written by Forsat Shirazi between 1881 and 1895 which mostly contains first-hand biographical information about the elite of Fārs, sources on the history of the region as well as its geography. It also involves a collection of more than fifty drawings of various historical sites of Persia, especially Fārs. It is an important book because of accurate renditions with Qajar style—of the reliefs and buildings at Persepolis.

Onomastics

The title of the book Asar-e Ajam is an Arabic phrase which consists of two nouns; "Asar" (in Perso-Arabic alphabet: آثار) (or "Athar" in its original Arabic pronunciation) which means deeds, antiquities or monuments, and Ajam which in Arabic literature refers to the Persians.

Documentary 
In 2016 Iranian documentary director Hassan Naghashi made a film named Asar-e Ajam which mainly dealt with the life of Forsat-od Dowla and most specifically the structure of the book and its publication.

Notes

References

Persian-language books
Geography books
Geography of Fars Province
History of Fars Province
Qajar Iran